Moe Bandy is an American country music artist. His discography consists of 36 studio albums, seven compilation albums, three live albums, 54 singles, and four music videos. 51 of his singles charted on the Billboard Hot Country Songs chart between 1974 and 1989, including the number one hits "Just Good Ol' Boys" (with Joe Stampley) and "I Cheated Me Right Out of You", both in 1979.

Studio albums

1970s

1980s

1990s–2000s

Compilation albums

Live albums

Singles

1970s

1980s and 1990s

Music videos

Notes

References

Country music discographies
Discographies of American artists